Mohn is a surname. The word in German means "poppy". Notable people with the surname include:

 Albert Henrik Mohn (1918–1999), Norwegian journalist
 Bill Mohn (William Kirk Mohn) (1899–?), American football player
 Christian Mohn (1926–2019), Norwegian ski jumper and sports official
 Ellef Mohn (1894–1974), Norwegian football player
 Emanuel Mohn (1842–1891), Norwegian educator
 Henrik Mohn (1835–1916), Norwegian astronomer and meteorologist
 Jakob Mohn (1838–1882), Norwegian statistician
 Leo Mohn (1925-1980), American politician
 Lothar Mohn (born 1954), German choral conductor
 Liz Mohn (born 1941), widow of Reinhard Mohn
 Louise Mohn (born 1974), Norwegian entrepreneur
 Per Mohn (born 1945), Norwegian politician
 Petra Mohn (1911–1996), Norwegian politician
 Reinhard Mohn (1921–2009), German businessman
 Sigfrid Mohn (born 1930), Norwegian politician
 Thorbjorn N. Mohn (1844–1899), American Lutheran church leader
 Trond Mohn (born 1943), Norwegian businessperson and philanthropist

See also
 Rieber-Mohn, a surname
 Mohns, a surname